Luis Sánchez-Moreno Lira (12 November 1925, Arequipa, Peru – 28 September 2009, LIma, Peru) was the Peruvian Archbishop of the Roman Catholic Archdiocese of Arequipa.

He was ordained a Roman Catholic priest with Opus Dei on 4 August 1957. He served as Archbishop of the archdiocese of Arequipa from 2 March 1996 until his retirement on 29 November 2003.

Death
He died on 28 September 2009 in Lima, Peru, aged 83.

References
Catholic Hierarchy: Archbishop Luis Sánchez-Moreno Lira †

1925 births
2009 deaths
Peruvian Roman Catholic archbishops
People from Arequipa
Opus Dei members
20th-century Roman Catholic bishops in Peru
Roman Catholic archbishops of Arequipa
Roman Catholic bishops of Chiclayo